The following is a list of Ohio State Buckeyes men's basketball head coaches.  The Ohio State Buckeyes men's basketball team has had 15 head coaches.

*113 games vacated by the NCAA.

Source

References

Ohio State

Ohio State Buckeyes basketball, men's, coaches
Ohio State Buckeyes basketball, men's, coaches